Umar Abdul Razak (born 1 October 1975) is a Ghanaian agriculturist and a former tutor at Tolon Senior High school. He was also a member of parliament for the Tolon constituency of the Northern Region of Ghana.

Early life and education 
Abdul-Razak was born on October 1, 1975. He  hails from Lungbunga in the Northern region of Ghana.He obtained a Bachelor of Science Degree in Renewable from the University for development studies.

Politics 
He is a member of the National Democratic Congress. He was a member of the Fifth Parliament of the Fourth Republic of Ghana as a representative of the National Democratic Congress. His political career began when he contested in the 2004 Ghanaian general election and obtained a total of 19, 123 votes thereby retaining the seat for the National Democratic Congress. He contested for his seat again in the  2008 Ghanaian general election and won with a total of 17,356 votes making a total percentage of 50.02.   He lost in the 2012 Ghanaian general election to a candidate of the New Patriotic Party, Wahab Suhiyinu Wumbei.

Personal life 
Razak belongs to the Islamic Religion (Muslim) and is married with two children.

References 

1975 births
Living people
Ghanaian MPs 2005–2009
Ghanaian MPs 2009–2013
National Democratic Congress (Ghana) politicians
University for Development Studies alumni
Agriculturalists
Ghanaian Muslims
People from Northern Region (Ghana)